is a Japanese voice actor affiliated with Office Osawa. Some of his notable roles include Eita Izumi in Just Because!, Seiya Takehaya in Tsurune, Assistant in Magical Sempai, and Nagara in Sonny Boy.

Biography
Ichikawa was born in Fukuoka Prefecture on October 2, 1991. In 2017, he starred in his first lead role as Eita Izumi in the anime series Just Because!. In 2022, he received the Best New Actor Award at the 16th Seiyu Awards.

Filmography

Television animation
2017
 Just Because! as Eita Izumi

2018
 Darling in the Franxx as Mitsuru
 Tsurune as Seiya Takehaya

2019
 Boogiepop and Others as Shiro Tanaka
 Bakugan: Battle Planet as Hydorous
 Magical Sempai as Assistant

2020
 Number24 as Yayoi Tsuzura
 Plunderer as Pele
 Fruits Basket 2nd Season as Naohito Sakuragi
 Wandering Witch: The Journey of Elaina as Emil

2021
 Horimiya as Ichiro Watabe
 The Saint's Magic Power Is Omnipotent as Rayne Salutania
 Sonny Boy as Nagara

2022
 Blue Lock as Gurimu Igarashi
 Spy × Family as Demetrius Desmond

2023
 Tsurune: The Linking Shot as Seiya Takehaya
 Hell's Paradise: Jigokuraku as Yamada Asaemon Fuchi

Original net animation
2020
 Bakugan: Armored Alliance as Hydorous

Original video animation
2018
 Hori-san to Miyamura-kun as Schoolboy A

2021
 The Ancient Magus' Bride: The Boy From the West and the Knight of the Mountain Haze as Mysterious Boy/Evan

Video games
2019
 Namu Amida Butsu! Rendai Utena as Rasetsuten, Kongōbu Bosatsu
 Ikemen Genjiden: Ayakashi Koi Enishi as Taira no Shigehira

2020
 White Cat Project as Sieg
 Disney Twisted-Wonderland as Ruggie Bucchi

2021
 The Caligula Effect 2 as Gin Noto
 Dragon Quest X as Doltam

References

External links
 Official agency profile 
 

1991 births
Japanese male video game actors
Japanese male voice actors
Living people
Male voice actors from Fukuoka Prefecture
Seiyu Award winners